James Robert Johnston (born 25 April 1980) is a Scottish bassist, vocalist, and songwriter, best known for his work with Scottish group Biffy Clyro. He is also known as Jim or Jimbo and sometimes signs his name as such.

Early life
Johnston was born and raised in Kilmarnock with his twin brother Ben (who became the drummer for Biffy Clyro), and his younger brother, Adam Johnston (who was Biffy Clyro's drum tech). The first gig he ever attended was Rancid at Glasgow Barrowlands in 1995, when he was fifteen.

Career

Biffy Clyro

Having previously played bass with schoolfriend Simon Neil and brother Ben Johnston in a band called Skrewfish in 1995, the trio moved to Glasgow, and were soon discovered by manager Dee Bahl, and then signed to Beggars Banquet, in 2001.

Marmaduke Duke

Johnston plays bass guitar when the conceptual rock duo Marmaduke Duke plays live.

Personal life
Johnston is fond of cycling, and can often be found cycling around the hills of Ayrshire.
Johnston currently resides with his wife in Glasgow, Scotland.

Musical equipment used
The following is a list of musical equipment used by James Johnston.

Bass guitars
Johnston's basses are usually tuned to Biffy Clyro's preferred tuning of (DADG), but sometimes (BADG) for "Pause it and Turn It Up" and (CGCF) for "Living is a Problem Because Everything Dies", as well as "That Golden Rule", "The Captain" and "Got Wrong".
 Ashdown Engineering - Ashdown The Saint - Seen in his playthrough of "End Of" on YouTube
 Fender Jazz Bass – Lake Placid Blue USA model with upgraded pickups.
 Fender Jazz Bass – White USA model with tortoise shell plate.
 Fender Precision Bass
 Fender Jazz Bass - American Standard - Black and Sunburst
 Fender Precision Bass - American Standard - Olympic White
 Fender Jazz Bass - American Deluxe - Natural
 Ernie Ball MusicMan Stingray
 Rickenbacker 4003 - Mountains music video
 Squier Jazz Bass - Squier James Johnston Signature Jazz Bass - Lake Placid Blue
 Nik Huber Rietbergen Bass - Nik Huber Rietbergen Bass - Red
 Gibson Grabber - Black, used in some acoustic sessions
 Fender Jazz Bass - American Standard - Frost Metallic (Q-Awards Acoustic Set - Camden Jazz Cafe, London 2013)

Effects pedals
 Tech21 SansAmp Bass Driver DI Preamp
 BOSS LS-2 Line Selector
 BOSS ODB-3 Overdrive
 BOSS TU-2 Chromatic Tuner

Amplifiers

 Ashdown CTM-300 Head
 Ashdown ABM 900 Head
 Ashdown Classic Cabinets
 Eden World Tour WT550 Amplifier Head
 Eden WTDI Preamp Di box

Other
 1.0mm bass pick
His tech is Dave White

Notes

Scottish bass guitarists
Scottish songwriters
People from Kilmarnock
1980 births
Living people
Identical twins
Alumni of Stow College
Biffy Clyro members
Scottish twins
21st-century bass guitarists
Twin musicians